Bloom-Carroll High School is a public high school located at 5420 Plum Rd NW, Carroll, Ohio  43112.  It is the only high school in the Bloom-Carroll School district.  The school's colors are purple and gold, and the school mascot is a Bulldog. Hence, their nickname is the "Bulldogs". Their school logo is: Our students•Their future•Our focus.

Ohio High School Athletic Association State Championships
 Girls Softball – 2006, 2007, 2013 
 Baseball - 2014

Eastland-Fairfield Career & Technical School

External links
 School Website

References

High schools in Fairfield County, Ohio
Public high schools in Ohio